The Siberian Elm cultivar Ulmus pumila 'Pyramidalis Fiorei' was cloned by the Charles Fiorei Nurseries of Prairie View, Illinois, c. 1957 from a tree growing in nursery grounds.

Description
The tree was described as being "strictly pyramidal" in form.

Pests and diseases
See under Ulmus pumila.

Cultivation
The tree is no longer listed by the Fiorei nursery and has probably been lost to cultivation.

References

Siberian elm cultivar
Ulmus articles missing images
Ulmus